Dror Moreh (born 4 November 1961) is an Israeli cinematographer and director.

Film career
Moreh's first film as director was Sharon, an investigation into the appeal of Israeli prime minister, Ariel Sharon.
His film, The Gatekeepers (2012), was nominated for Best Documentary Feature at the 85th Academy Awards. The film attracted attention partly due to its controversial interviews with the head of Israel's Security Agency (Shin Bet). Moreh said, "I think that those guys who implement the power and force… understand that power and force can lead you up to a certain point, and beyond that, you have to take other measures."

The Human Factor, which is about the Israeli-Palestinian conflict was released January 2021.

See also
Cinema of Israel

References

External links

1961 births
Living people
Israeli documentary filmmakers
Israeli Jews
Israeli film directors
Israeli film producers